The Canada national ice sledge hockey team is the men's team representing Canada at international competition. The team has been overseen since 2003 by Hockey Canada, a member of the International Ice Hockey Federation. From 1993 until 2003, the team was an associate member of Hockey Canada. Since 2010 international para ice hockey has been a mixed event but Team Canada has yet to name a female player to its roster for any tournament. The national team created exclusively for Canadian women is the Canada women's national ice sledge hockey team. This article deals chiefly with the national men's team.

The team is featured in the 2008 documentary "Sledhead".

Competition achievements

Paralympic Games

IPC World Championships 
The World Para Ice Hockey Championships, known before 30 November 2016 as the IPC Ice Sledge Hockey World Championships, are the world championships for para ice hockey. They are organized by the International Paralympic Committee through its World Para Ice Hockey subcommittee.

Canadian Tire Para Hockey Cup
The Canadian Tire Para Hockey Cup, formerly the World Sledge Hockey Challenge (WSHC) is an international para ice hockey invitational tournament hosted by Canada's National Sledge Team in which three top nations are invited to compete.

Roster

2018 Paralympics roster

The following is the Canadian roster in the men's ice sledge hockey tournament of the 2018 Winter Paralympics.

See also

Canada men's national ice hockey team
Canada women's national ice sledge hockey team
World Para Ice Hockey Championships
Para ice hockey at the Winter Paralympics
Canadian Tire Para Hockey Cup

References

External links
 at Hockey Canada

National ice sledge hockey teams
Ice Sledge Hockey